The 2022 Imola FIA Formula 3 round was a motor racing event held on 23 and 24 April 2022 at the Autodromo Internazionale Enzo e Dino Ferrari, Imola, Italy. It is the second round of the 2022 FIA Formula 3 Championship, and is held in support of the 2022 Emilia Romagna Grand Prix.

Driver changes
Multiple driver changes took place for the second round at the Imola Circuit. Trident driver Jonny Edgar pulled out of the championship after being diagnosed with Crohn's disease and was replaced by former HWA Racelab driver Oliver Rasmussen. Federico Malvestiti returned to the championship after a year's absence, replacing Niko Kari at Jenzer Motorsport. Charouz Racing System driver Ayrton Simmons vacated his seat and was replaced by David Schumacher, who previously raced with the team in 2020. ART Grand Prix fielded only two cars at Imola, as Juan Manuel Correa was forced to miss the event due to a foot injury.

Classification

Qualifying 
Qualifying took place on 22 April 2022, with Barbadian Zane Maloney taking his maiden pole position for Trident.

Sprint Race 

Notes:
 – Ido Cohen originally finished 22nd, but received a five-second time penalty for exceeding track limits.
 – Kaylen Frederick originally finished eighth, but was later given a five-second time penalty for causing a collision with Ido Cohen.
 – Enzo Trulli originally finished 21st, but was later given a five-second time penalty for overtaking Ido Cohen under yellow flag conditions.

Feature Race 

Notes:
 – Ido Cohen originally finished tenth, but was later given a five-second time penalty for repeatedly exceeding track limits at turn 9.
 – Oliver Bearman originally finished fourth, but was later given a 20-second time penalty for causing a collision with Grégoire Saucy.

Standings after the event 

Drivers' Championship standings

Teams' Championship standings

 Note: Only the top five positions are included for both sets of standings.

See also 
 2022 Emilia Romagna Grand Prix
 2022 Imola Formula 2 round

Notes

References

External links 

 Official website

|- style="text-align:center"
|width="35%"|Previous race:
|width="30%"|FIA Formula 3 Championship2022 season
|width="40%"|Next race:

Imola
Imola
Imola